Vestfold og Telemark is a county under disestablishment in Norway. The county is the southernmost one of Eastern Norway and consists of two distinct and separate traditional regions: the former counties of Telemark and (most of) Vestfold. The capital is located at the town of Skien, which is also the county's largest city. While Skien is the seat of the county municipality, the seat of the County Governor is Tønsberg. It borders the counties of Viken, Vestland, Rogaland and Agder.

Telemark voted against the merger, on the basis that the regions have nothing in common and do not constitute a natural geographical, cultural, social or political entity. Regardless, the Storting voted on 7 January 2018 to merge the counties by force, and the merger took effect on 1 January 2020. Unlike Telemark or Vestfold, it does not form a traditional or cultural region, but is instead administrative.

On 15 February 2022, the county council decided to vote for the future of Vestfold og Telemark county as it was reported that politicians did not co-operate well across the former county borders. With 42 votes against 19, the county council voted for a separation of the county into its former counties of Telemark and Vestfold. Representatives to the respective county councils will be elected in the 2023 local elections and the old counties will be re-established by 1 January 2024.

History
The region of Vestfold and Telemark consists of the two former counties of Telemark and Vestfold, whose administrative histories are separate.

Telemark County was established in 1919 as a continuation of the former Bratsberg amt, which had been a len and amt since the union with Denmark. Bratsberg amt and the later Telemark county consist of several partly overlapping historic districts. The name Telemark itself did not originally cover the coasts, and the minority at the Storting therefore proposed the name Grenland-Telemark when the modern county was established.

Vestfold County was established in 1919 as a continuation of the former Jarlsberg and Larviks amt. The latter was established in 1821 when the counties of Laurvig and Jarlsberg were dissolved and merged into a common county.

The merging process
A possible merger of the counties has been discussed for several years with different constellations. Telemark County Council voted in April 2017 against a merge with Vestfold. Vestfold County Council voted for a merge with both Telemark and Buskerud. The Storting decided a merger of Telemark and Vestfold on 8 June 2017 with effect from 1 January 2020.

The Language Council of Norway recommended the name Telemark og Vestfold as the name for the new county. However, Telemark County Council decided that the name Telemark under any circumstances had to be included in the new name, while Vestfold County Council suggested the name of Vest-Viken, which was criticized because the name was originally created by the Nazi Quisling regime during World War 2. The name Vest-Viken was in use when the Reichskommissariat administration merged the separate counties of Vestfold and Buskerud into a single administrative unit. It was also unfavoured because Telemark is mostly located outside the historical Viken area; at best the small coastal area of the county may be included in the periphery of Viken. Media in Norway, such as the state broadcaster NRK, mocked the proposal Vest-Viken as a "Nazi name".

On 10 November 2017, Vestfold withdrew the proposal of Vest-Viken and it became apparent that both counties supported the Language Council's proposal on Telemark and Vestfold. Eventually the local politicians agreed on Vestfold og Telemark as a compromise, although Telemark politicians stated that Telemark should be the first part of the name, both for alphabetical reasons and because of the Telemark name's iconic status in Norway and internationally, a status that the Vestfold name lacks. As of 2018, Telemark og Vestfold is already the name of the relevant branches of several government agencies, and both name forms are widely used.

As Vestfold was forcibly merged with Telemark, Svelvik municipality decided to vote for a merger with Drammen municipality, which would lead Svelvik to leave Vestfold county and join the new county of Viken on 1 January 2020. The vote turned in favor for merging with Drammen municipality, along with the former municipality of Nedre Eiker.

Municipalities

Vestfold og Telemark 
Vestfold og Telemark County has a total of 23 municipalities:

Urban areas 
The largest urban areas of Vestfold og Telemark, sorted after population (municipalities in parenthesis):

 Porsgrunn/Skien - 92 753 (Bamble, Porsgrunn, Skien) This also includes the towns of Brevik, Langesund, Porsgrunn, Skien and Stathelle.
 Tønsberg - 56 293 (Færder, Tønsberg)
 Sandefjord - 43 595 (Sandefjord)
 Larvik - 24 208 (Larvik)
 Horten - 20 371 (Horten)
 Notodden - 9 077 (Notodden)
 Holmestrand - 7 262 (Holmestrand)
 Stavern - 5 628 (Larvik)
 Kragerø - 5 445 (Kragerø)
 Vear - 3 642 (Sandefjord, Tønsberg)
 Stokke - 3 631 (Sandefjord)
 Bø - 3 285 (Midt-Telemark)
 Rjukan - 3 247 (Tinn)
 Åsgårdstrand - 3 091 (Horten, Tønsberg)
 Tjøme - 2 945 (Færder)
 Selvik - 2 685 (Sande)
 Sem - 2 481 (Sandefjord, Tønsberg)
 Revetal/Bergsåsen - 2 403 (Tønsberg)
 Ulefoss - 2 275 (Nome)
 Sande - 2 254 (Sande)
 Andebu - 2 207 (Sandefjord)
 Melsomvik - 2 113 (Sandefjord)
 Gullhaug - 2 038 (Holmestrand)

Brevik, Holmestrand, Horten, Kragerø, Langesund, Larvik, Notodden, Porsgrunn, Rjukan, Sandefjord, Skien, Stathelle, Stavern, Tønsberg and Åsgårdstrand all have town status.

References

 
Counties of Norway
2020 establishments in Norway
States and territories established in 2020